Qareh Quch (also Romanized as Qareh Qūch; also known as Qareh Qūch-e Soflá, Ghareh Ghooch, Karakhach Yukāri, Karakhach Yukhari, Karakuch, and Qarehkhāch Yūkharī) is a village in Minjavan-e Gharbi Rural District, Minjavan District, Khoda Afarin County, East Azerbaijan Province, Iran. At the 2006 census, its population was 66, in 16 families.

References 

Populated places in Khoda Afarin County